Joyce Lawrence (née Schram) is a former state legislator in Colorado. She served in the Colorado House of Representatives from 1995 to 2003. In 2002, she ran unsuccessfully for a state senate seat. A Republican, she served as Pueblo, Colorado's city council president. She served on the Capitol Development Committee including as its chair.

References

American nursing administrators
American women nurses
Colorado Republicans
Living people
People from East Lansing, Michigan
People from Pueblo, Colorado
Republican Party members of the Colorado House of Representatives
University of Michigan alumni
University of Phoenix alumni
Women city councillors in Colorado
Women state legislators in Colorado
Year of birth missing (living people)